"Hard Times" is a rap song written by Jimmy Bralower, J.B. Moore, Russell Simmons, Larry Smith and William Waring originally recorded by Kurtis Blow for his 1980 eponymous debut album.

A 1983 cover by rap group Run–D.M.C. was issued as their second single, and is the first track on their eponymous debut album Run–D.M.C..

Track listing
 12" Profile - PRO-7036 (US)
 "Hard Times" (D. McDaniels, J. Simmons, L. Smith, W. Warring) - 5:10
 "Jam-Master Jay" (D. McDaniels, J. Mitzell, J. Simmons, L. Smith, R. Simmons) - 3:21
 "Hard Times (Instrumental)" (D. McDaniels, J. Simmons, L. Smith, W. Warring) - 3:51	
 "Jam-Master Jay (Instrumental)" (D. McDaniels, J. Mitzell, J. Simmons, L. Smith, R. Simmons) - 3:51

Chart positions

Notes:

 1 - Charted with "Jam Master Jay"

References

1983 songs
1984 singles
Run-DMC songs
Songs written by Russell Simmons
Arista Records singles